Colonial elections were held in South Australia from 6 April to 7 May 1868. All 36 seats in the South Australian House of Assembly were up for election.

The three years following the 1865 election were the most unstable in terms of government in the history of the parliament. The government of Arthur Blyth was defeated immediately the Assembly met after the election. Francis Dutton’s government lasted 182 days, Henry Ayers returned for 33 days, then John Hart for 156 days, James Boucaut for just over one year. Henry Ayers returned to take the Assembly into the election.

Since the inaugural 1857 election, no parties or stable groupings had been formed, which resulted in frequent changes of the Premier. If for any reason the incumbent Premier of South Australia lost sufficient support through a successful motion of no confidence at any time on the floor of the house, he would tender his resignation to the Governor of South Australia, which would result in another member deemed to have the support of the House of Assembly being sworn in by the Governor as the next Premier.

Informal groupings began and increased government stability occurred from the 1887 election. The United Labor Party would be formed in 1891, while the National Defence League would be formed later in the same year.

See also
Premier of South Australia

Notes

References
History of South Australian elections 1857-2006, volume 1: ECSA
Statistical Record of the Legislature 1836-2007: SA Parliament

Elections in South Australia
1868 elections in Australia
1860s in South Australia
May 1868 events
April 1868 events